Jeff Stewart is a music video director signed to Sugarshock Imageworks in Burbank, California.

Videography 
Squad Five-0 - Bye American - 2004
Shimmer - Don't Trip on Your Way Out - 2005
Powerman 5000 - Wild World - 2006
Cody McCarver – Red Flag – 2006
Dustin Kensrue - Pistol - 2006

Producer 
Powerman 5000 - Wild World - 2006
Cody McCarver – Red Flag – 2006
Dustin Kensrue - Pistol - 2006
Billy Bob Thornton - Hearts Like Mine - 2007

Television 
Jeff Stewart directed the pilot of a TV show for Lionsgate titled Death Valley with Spider One from Powerman 5000.  Rob Zombie is rumored to be involved in this project as an Executive Producer.

Awards and notable mentions 
Powerman 5000's Wild World was nominated for MTV2's HBB Best Video of the Year Award 2006.

Powerman 5000's Wild World was featured in Revolver Magazine's Best Videos of 2006 article.

External links 
 mvdbase.com - Jeff Stewart Videography
 Powerman 5000's Music Videos on Yahoo Music
 Videostatic's Production Company Update

American music video directors
Year of birth missing (living people)
Living people